Common stork's-bill is a common name for several plants and may refer to:

Erodium ciconium, annual herb in the family Geraniaceae
Erodium cicutarium, herbaceous annual – or in warm climates, biennial – member of the family Geraniaceae